is a Japanese manga writer and screenwriter. He works as a story writer for manga, anime and live-action film. Sanjo graduated from Meiji University.

Dragon Quest: The Adventure of Dai (1989–1996), which he created with illustrator Koji Inada, is one of the best-selling manga in history with over 47 million copies sold. The two also created Beet the Vandel Buster (2002–2006, 2016–present), which has 4 million copies in print.

Selected works

Anime

OVAs
MD Geist (1986)
Cybernetics Guardian (1989)
The Guyver: Bio-Booster Armor (1989-1990)
MD Geist II: Death Force (1996)
Ultraman Super Fighter Legend (1996)

Television
 series head writer denoted in bold
Gaiking: Legend of Daiku-Maryu (2005-2006)
Happy Lucky Bikkuriman (2006-2007): eps 20-46
GeGeGe no Kitarō 5th series (2007-2009): eps 27-100
Digimon Fusion (2010-2012)

Film
 Gegege no Kitarō: Explosive Japan!! (2008)

Manga
Dragon Quest: Dai no Daibōken (1989-1996)
Ultraman Super Fighter Legend (1993-1997): as Ryu Sagawa
Beet the Vandel Buster (2002-2006, 2016–present)
Fuuto PI (2017–present)
Dragon Quest: Dai no Daibouken - Yuusha Avan to Gokuen no Maou (2020-present)

Live-action TV
 series head writer denoted in bold
Cutey Honey The Live (2007)
Kamen Rider W (2009-2010)
Kamen Rider Fourze (2011-2012)
Zyuden Sentai Kyoryuger (2013-2014)
Satria Garuda BIMA-X (2014-2015)
Kamen Rider Drive (2014-2015)
Kamen Rider Zero-One (2019-2020)
Mashin Sentai Kiramager (2020)

Live-action films
Kamen Rider × Kamen Rider W & Decade: Movie War 2010 (2009)
 Kamen Rider W: Begins Night
Kamen Rider W Forever: A to Z/The Gaia Memories of Fate (2010)
Kamen Rider × Kamen Rider OOO & W Featuring Skull: Movie War Core (2010)
 Kamen Rider Skull: Message for Double 
 Movie War Core
Kamen Rider Eternal (2011)
Piece~Fragments of a Memory~ (2012)
Zyuden Sentai Kyoryuger: Gaburincho of Music (2013)
Zyuden Sentai Kyoryuger vs. Go-Busters: The Great Dinosaur Battle! Farewell Our Eternal Friends (2014)
Zyuden Sentai Kyoryuger Returns: 100 Years After (2014)
Kamen Rider × Kamen Rider Drive & Gaim: Movie War Full Throttle (2014)
 Kamen Rider Drive: The Challenge From Lupin
 Movie War Full Throttle
Kamen Rider Drive: Surprise Future (2015)
Drive Saga: Kamen Rider Chaser (2016)
Drive Saga: Kamen Rider Heart (2016)
Drive Saga: Kamen Rider Brain (2019)

References

External links

1964 births
Japanese screenwriters
Living people
Manga artists from Ōita Prefecture
Manga writers
Writers from Ōita Prefecture